Susanne Heim is a German political scientist and historian of National Socialism, the Holocaust and international refugee policy.

Selected publications

English language
Architects of annihilation: Auschwitz and the logic of destruction. 2003. (With Gotz Aly)

German language
 Deutsches Reich: 1938 – August 1939. Band 2 von: Götz Aly (Hrsg.): Die Verfolgung und Ermordung der europäischen Juden durch das nationalsozialistische Deutschland 1933–1945. R. Oldenbourg Verlag, München 2009, . (Bearbeitung)
 Fluchtpunkt Karibik. Jüdische Emigranten in der Dominikanischen Republik. 1. Auflage, Ch. Links Verlag, Berlin 2009, . (Mit: Hans Ulrich Dillmann)
 The Kaiser Wilhelm Society under national socialism. Cambridge University Press, New York City 2009, . (Englisch; Herausgeberin)
 Kalorien, Kautschuk, Karrieren. Pflanzenzüchtung und landwirtschaftliche Forschung in Kaiser-Wilhelm-Instituten 1933 bis 1945. Band 5 von: Kaiser-Wilhelm-Gesellschaft zur Förderung der Wissenschaften: Geschichte der Kaiser-Wilhelm-Gesellschaft im Nationalsozialismus. Wallstein-Verlag, Göttingen 2003, .
 Architects of annihilation. Auschwitz and the logic of destruction. Weidenfeld and Nicolson, London 2002, : (Englisch; mit: Götz Aly)
 Autarkie und Ostexpansion. Pflanzenzucht und Agrarforschung im Nationalsozialismus. Band 2 von: Kaiser-Wilhelm-Gesellschaft zur Förderung der Wissenschaften: Geschichte der Kaiser-Wilhelm-Gesellschaft im Nationalsozialismus. Wallstein-Verlag, Göttingen 2002, . (Herausgeberin)
 Berechnung und Beschwörung. Überbevölkerung – Kritik einer Debatte. Verlag der Buchläden Schwarze Risse / Rote Strasse, Berlin 1996, . (Mit: Ulrike Schaz)
 Vordenker der Vernichtung. Auschwitz und die deutschen Pläne für eine neue europäische Ordnung. Durchgesehene Ausgabe, Fischer-Taschenbuch-Verlag, Frankfurt am Main 1993, . (Mit: Götz Aly; Lizenzausgabe des Hoffmann-und-Campe-Verlags, Hamburg); erweiterte Neuausgabe Fischer Taschenbuch, Frankfurt/Main 2013,

References

German women historians
21st-century German historians
Historians of the Holocaust
Historians of Nazism
Living people
Year of birth missing (living people)
Place of birth missing (living people)